John Shore, 1st Baron Teignmouth was Governor-General of India.

John Shore may also refer to:

 John Shore (trumpeter) (1662–1752), English trumpeter and lutenist who invented the tuning fork
 Johnny Shore, Canadian football player
 John Shore (priest) on List of Archdeacons of Cardigan

See also
John Shaw (disambiguation)
John Shawe (disambiguation)